Pleasant Township, Indiana may refer to one of the following places:

 Pleasant Township, Allen County, Indiana
 Pleasant Township, Grant County, Indiana
 Pleasant Township, Johnson County, Indiana
 Pleasant Township, LaPorte County, Indiana
 Pleasant Township, Porter County, Indiana
 Pleasant Township, Steuben County, Indiana
 Pleasant Township, Switzerland County, Indiana
 Pleasant Township, Wabash County, Indiana

There is also: Mount Pleasant Township, Delaware County, Indiana

See also 

Pleasant Township (disambiguation)

Indiana township disambiguation pages